Jan P. Fokkelman (born 23 March 1940) is a Dutch biblical scholar. Fokkelman was born in Batavia, in the Dutch East Indies. He studied, and then taught, at the University of Leiden.

Fokkelman is perhaps best known for his 4-volume, 2400-page work on the Books of Samuel. Fokkelman is a central figure in the "narrative revolution" in biblical studies, which emphasises a literary approach to the text.

He lives in Zutphen.

References

Living people
1940 births
Dutch biblical scholars
Old Testament scholars
Leiden University alumni
Academic staff of Leiden University
People from Batavia, Dutch East Indies